Jerzy (George) Tadeusz Lukowski (or Łukowski) is a Polish-British historian at University of Birmingham. He specializes in studies of the 18th century Polish–Lithuanian Commonwealth.

Selected publications 
A Concise History of Poland, with Hubert Zawadzki, Cambridge University Press, 1st edition 2001, 2nd edition 2006, 
Liberty's Folly: The Polish–Lithuanian Commonwealth in the Eighteenth Century, 1697-1795, Routledge, 1991, 
The Partitions of Poland 1772, 1793, 1795, Longman Publishing Group, 1999, 
The European Nobility in the Eighteenth Century, Palgrave Macmillan, 2003,

References

External links
Homepage at University of Birmingham

British historians
20th-century Polish historians
Polish male non-fiction writers
Living people
Year of birth missing (living people)
Academics of the University of Birmingham
Place of birth missing (living people)
Historians of Poland
Historians of Lithuania